The Laponian area is a large mountainous wildlife area in the Lapland province in northern Sweden, more precisely in Gällivare Municipality, Arjeplog Municipality and Jokkmokk Municipality.

It was made a UNESCO World Heritage Site in 1996; the bulk of it had enjoyed protected status since the early 20th century. The area was made a heritage site for both natural and cultural reasons.

Only parts of the area is actually used for pasture by them. With such a large space, the geography of the area varies greatly; it is dominated by mountains, rivers and lakes. Each nature reserve and national park has its distinctive features. The amount of snow in winter and rain in summer is considerable.

95% of the area is protected as national parks or nature reserves.  It consists of the national parks Muddus, Sarek, Padjelanta and Stora Sjöfallet, and the nature reserves Sjaunja and Stubba. The remaining 5% are located in the areas of Sulitelma, Tjuoltadalen, and Rapadalen (part of which is in the Sarek park).

The village of Porjus is a natural point of entry to the Laponian area and has recently opened an information center.

The Laponia area also contains three major hydropower stations with belonging basins and a big expansion of 100 wind power stations inside the world heritage area is planned.

Gallery

See also
Lapland Biosphere Reserve

References

External links 
 Unesco site
 Swedish National Heritage Board site

World Heritage Sites in Sweden
Lapland (Sweden)
National parks of Sweden
Geography of Norrbotten County
Gällivare Municipality